The 2023 Nigerian presidential election in Delta State will be held on 25 February 2023 as part of the nationwide 2023 Nigerian presidential election to elect the president and vice president of Nigeria. Other federal elections, including elections to the House of Representatives and the Senate, will also be held on the same date while state elections will be held two weeks afterward on 11 March.

Background
Delta State is a diverse state in the South South; although its oil reserves make it one of the most wealthy states in the nation, Delta has faced challenges in frequent oil spills, environmental degradation, and cult violence in large part due to years of systemic corruption. Politically, the state's 2019 elections were categorized as a continuation of the PDP's control as Governor Ifeanyi Okowa won with over 80% of the vote and the party won a majority in the House of Assembly along with holding two senate seats. For the federal House, the PDP won back one seat lost from a defection but the seat of a different defector from the PDP went to the APC leaving the total results at 9 PDP, 1 APC. Although the state was easily won by PDP presidential nominee Atiku Abubakar, it still swung towards Buhari compared to 2015 and had much lower turnout.

Polling

Projections

General election

Results

By senatorial district 
The results of the election by senatorial district.

By federal constituency
The results of the election by federal constituency.

By local government area 
The results of the election by local government area.

See also 
 2023 Delta State elections
 2023 Nigerian presidential election

Notes

References 

Delta State gubernatorial election
2023 Delta State elections
Delta